Lorraine T. Hunt (born March 11, 1939) is an American businesswoman, former politician and entertainer who served as the 32nd lieutenant governor of Nevada from 1999 to 2007.

Hunt was elected to the Clark County Commission in 1994, defeating Democratic incumbent Karen Hayes. As a Clark County Commissioner, Hunt served as the first woman Chairperson of the Las Vegas Convention and Visitors Authority (LVCVA), Vice-Chair of the University Medical Center (UMC), and Trustee, McCarran International Airport Board of Trustees.

In 1998 Hunt was elected Lieutenant Governor of Nevada, defeating Democrat Rose McKinney-James. She was re-elected in 2002 by defeating Democratic Clark County commissioner Erin Kenny. As lieutenant governor, Hunt focused primarily on tourism and economic development related policies.  She served as President of the Nevada State Senate, a member of Governor Kenny Guinn's cabinet, Chairwoman of the State Tourism Commission, Chairwoman of the State Economic Development Commission, and Vice Chairwoman of the Department of Transportation Board of Directors.

Hunt was a candidate for the Republican nomination for the 2006 Nevada gubernatorial election. She lost the Republican primary against Congressman Jim Gibbons. Hunt is the owner of The Bootlegger Bistro, a restaurant and special events center, long popular with Las Vegas locals and showroom performers. Hunt is herself a singer, and often performs at the restaurant.

Personal life

Hunt attended Westlake College of Music in Los Angeles, California studying piano and music composition. In 1959, as a member of Local 369 of the Las Vegas Musicians Union, Lorraine began singing and contracting musical groups for the Nevada Entertainment Circuit (Las Vegas, Reno and Lake Tahoe).

In 1972, Hunt became CEO of Perri Inc., a real estate development, restaurant and entertainment management company.  In the 1980s, she was a founder of Continental National Bank, director of First Security Bank of Nevada, advisory board member of Wells Fargo Bank, director of Las Vegas Events and director of The Nevada Development Authority.

Hunt is married to Dennis Bono, recording artist and music talk show host of The Dennis Bono Show Live from Las Vegas. Lorraine and Dennis were married in 2006 and between them have two children.

See also
List of female lieutenant governors in the United States

References

External links

1939 births
Living people
Clark County, Nevada commissioners
Lieutenant Governors of Nevada
Nevada Republicans
Politicians from Las Vegas
Politicians from Niagara Falls, New York
Women in Nevada politics
21st-century American women